Empire Arrow may refer to:

 , built in Camden, New Jersey, in 1921 and scrapped c. 1938
 ,  built in Sunderland in 1945 and scrapped in Kynosoura in 1981

Ship names